Villeneuve-de-la-Raho is a commune in the Pyrénées-Orientales department, southern France.

Geography 
Villeneuve-de-la-Raho is located in the canton of La Plaine d'Illibéris and in the arrondissement of Perpignan. The town is the location of Lac de Villeneuve-de-la-Raho.

Population

See also
 Communes of the Pyrénées-Orientales department
 Lac de Villeneuve-de-la-Raho

References

Communes of Pyrénées-Orientales